Lampsi (Greek: Η Λάμψη, English: The Shine) was the longest running series in Greek television, among the most famous in Greece and Bulgaria. It was aired for more than 14 years by the Greek television station ANT1 nearly every day. Bulgarian television network Nova Television aired "Shine", dubbed in Bulgarian from 2000 to 2010.

It began broadcasting on 16 September 1991 and the last episode was released on 29 July 2005. In total 3,457 episodes were broadcast in 14 years. A total of 150,000 dialogues pages were written for 190 stories, involving 1,500 actors, seven directors and countless technicians.

The script was written by Nikos Foskolos and on the filming of the episodes directors were Nikos Foskolos, Spyros Foskolos and five other directors.

Cast and crew

Cast

Main cast

Recurring cast

References

External links
 Ιστορίες με... Δράκους τέλος!, της Κατερίνας Ζάννη. Ελευθεροτυπία, 28 Ιουλίου 2005, ανακτήθηκε στις 13 Ιανουαρίου 2008.
 «Έλαμψε» 3.457 φορές, των Μ. Πετρούτσου, Σ. Μανιάτη, Κ. Τσιγώνια, Ελευθεροτυπία, 28 Ιουλίου 2005, ανακτήθηκε στις 13 Ιανουαρίου 2008.
 Το «σαπούνι» φέρνει δάκρυα, Ελεύθερος Τύπος, 7 Ιουλίου 2007, ανακτήθηκε στις 13 Ιανουαρίου 2008.
 «Η Λάμψη έγραψε ιστορία...» Νίκος Φώσκολος, της Τζένης Θεοδωρίδου, 7 Μέρες TV, 22 Ιουλίου 2005, ανακτήθηκε στις 20 Μαΐου 2010.

1991 Greek television series debuts
2005 Greek television series endings
1990s Greek television series
2000s Greek television series
Greek television soap operas
ANT1 original programming
Greek-language television shows